The Peltulaceae are a family of ascomycete fungi. Most species are lichenized, and are widely distributed, found mostly in arid regions.

References

Lichinomycetes
Lichen families
Taxa described in 1986